Akkachipatti is a village in the Gandaravakottai revenue block of Pudukkottai district, Tamil Nadu, India.

The area of Akkachipatti is linked with Wigan, UK, and they have enjoyed a prosperous relationship since 09/07/2012.

References

Villages in Pudukkottai district